Uri is a comune (municipality) in the Province of Sassari in the Italian region Sardinia, located about  from Alghero (airport) and about  northwest of Sassari and about  from Cagliari (airport). It is known for its artichoke festival, held annually in March.

Geography
Uri borders the following municipalities: Alghero, Ittiri, Olmedo, Putifigari, Sassari, Usini.

History
The earliest traces of human settlements in the Uri area, the so-called Domus de janas, date back to the 3rd millennium BC. The area, was also colonized by the Romans.
After the fall of the Western Roman Empire, Sardinia was held first by the Vandals and then by the Byzantines. According to the letters of Pope Gregory I, a Romanized and Christianized culture co-existed with several Pagan cultures.

Demographic evolution

Churches and archaeological site
 Nostra Signora della Pazienza Church XVI sc.
 Santa Croce Church XII sc.
 St.Catherine archaeological site
 Paulis abbey ruins XI sc.
 San Leonardo Church, XI sc.
 Santu Pedru Necropolis

Transportation
The nearest airport is Alghero-Fertilia International Airport,  from the city.

Uri is linked to Alghero by freeway SS127bis, to Sassari by the freeway Sp15m.

See also
Diocese of Alghero-Bosa
Fertilia Airport
History of Sardinia
Alghero

References

External links

Cities and towns in Sardinia